Robert Francis Lyons (born October 17, 1939, in Albany, New York) is an American actor of film and television. He is best known for guest starring in numerous popular television shows since the 1960s and for appearing in such films as Getting Straight (1970), Dark Night of the Scarecrow (1981), Death Wish II (1982), Murphy's Law (1986) and Platoon Leader (1988).

Career
Lyons made his screen debut in the television series I Dream of Jeannie and made his film debut in Pendulum (1969), followed by Getting Straight (1970). Since then he has appeared in such films as Shoot Out (1971) (as the main villain, opposite good guy Gregory Peck), Avenging Angel (1985) and Pray for Morning (2006) and such television shows as Gunsmoke, Medical Center, Falcon Crest, Roswell and Criminal Minds. In 1999 he played Dr Lester Arnold on Days of Our Lives. In 2015 he co-starred with Danny Trejo in the zombie film The Burning Dead.

Selected TV and filmography

1966: Days of Our Lives (TV Series) as Dr. Lester Arnold (1999)
1966–1973: The F.B.I (TV Series) as John Brackney / Lon Owens / Ronald Loper
1967: Bonanza (TV Series) as Sandy
1967: Gunsmoke (TV Series) as Maxwell
1968: Judd, for the Defense (TV Series) as Archie Fryell
1969: Pendulum as Paul Sanderson
1969: Land of the Giants (TV Series) as Nalor
1970: Getting Straight as Nick
1970: Ironside (TV Series) as Garvie Durko
1970–1972: Medical Center (TV Series) as Pete / David Drayton
1971: Shoot Out as Bobby Jay Jones
1971: The Todd Killings as Skipper Todd
1972: Dealing: Or the Berkeley-to-Boston Forty-Brick Lost-Bag Blues (TV Movie) as Peter
1974: The Disappearance of Flight 412 as Captain Cliff Riggs
1974: Paper Moon (TV series) as Clyde Barrow
1977: Black Oak Conspiracy as Harrison Hancock
1978: The Ghost of Flight 401 (TV Movie) as Bill Bowdish
1979: Death Car on the Freeway (TV Movie) as Barry Hill
1979–1981: The Incredible Hulk (TV Series) as Sam / Joe Conti
1980: Quincy M.E. (TV Series) as Bob Denvo
1980: Fantasy Island (TV Series) as Carl
1980–1981: CHiPs (TV Series) as Arnold / Toro
1981: Gangster Wars as Legs Diamond
1981: Dark Night of the Scarecrow (TV Movie) as Skeeter Norris
1981–1982: Falcon Crest (TV Series) as Turner Bates
1982: Death Wish II as Fred McKenzie
1982: Magnum, P.I. as Taylor Hurst
1983: 10 to Midnight as Nathan Zager
1983–1985: Matt Houston (TV Series) as Wade Kimball / Perry Brandon
1984: Simon & Simon (TV Series) as Frank Gaul
1985: Avenging Angel as Lt. Hugh Andrews
1985: Cease Fire as Luke
1985: Knight Rider (TV Series) as Jeff Cavanaugh
1986: Murphy's Law as Art Penney
1987: Murder, She Wrote (TV Series) as Steve Honig
1988: Platoon Leader as Sgt. Michael McNamara
1989: American Eagle as Rudy Argente
1989: Prime Suspect as Sheriff Hank Fallon
1994: The Dragon Gate as Jack the Drunk
1995: Ripper Man as Frankel
1996: Walker, Texas Ranger (TV Series) as Duncan McCallum
1996: Exit in Red as Detective Vollers
1997: Pensacola: Wings of Gold as Addison's Father
1998: Mike Hammer, Private Eye as Joe Rollins 
1999–2000 Roswell (TV Series) as Hank Whitmore
1999: The Omega Code as General
2001: Family Law (TV Series) as Judge Christie
2004: Love's Enduring Promise (TV Movie) as Doc Watkins
2005: Silent Partner as U.S. Vice President
2006: Pray for Morning as Proctor
2006: Cold Case (TV Series) as Scott "Skiz" Stenkovic (2006)
2006: Cut Off as Dick
2009–2011: Criminal Minds (TV Series) as Bartender / Mr Donovan
2010: Confession as Mac
2011: Peach Plum Pear as Hank
2015: The Burning Dead as Old Ben

Notes

External links
 

1938 births
American male film actors
American male television actors
Living people
Male actors from New York (state)
Actors from Albany, New York
20th-century American male actors
21st-century American male actors